Neil Barrett (born in Devon) is an English fashion designer.  He built his business around minimalist menswear.

Born in England, a fourth generation tailor, Barrett studied at both Central Saint Martins and the Royal College of Art. Immediately after his graduation, Barrett was recruited to work at Gucci, where he was appointed Senior Men's Designer.

After five years with Gucci, Barrett approached Prada's CEO Patrizio Bertelli proposing the start of a men's line: a few months later Prada Menswear was born with Barrett as Design Director.

In 2009, Neil Barrett created a production division based in Tuscany, where all sampling, production, and distribution are coordinated.

The brand has over 550 multi-brand stores worldwide alongside a total of 31
mono-brand stores and shop in shops, whose concept has been developed with Zaha Hadid Architects.

Movies and Celebrities
Neil Barrett’s suits have been associated with the likes of Gary Barlow, Ben Whishaw, and Matthew Morrison, but international personalities began turning to Neil Barrett for their wardrobe needs since 2004: Orlando Bloom, Colin Firth, Jake Gyllenhaal, Lenny Kravitz, Ewan McGregor, Chris Martin, and Mark Ruffalo just to name a few. Barrett was especially proud when Brad Pitt chose to wear Neil Barrett for his change in image with Mr. & Mrs. Smith, becoming the first celebrity to wear one of the "hand aged" leather jackets that have since become signature pieces in the Neil Barrett collections.

After the launch of his Womenswear Collections, Barrett has attracted celebrities, such as Jennifer Aniston, Madonna, Kirsten Dunst, Angelina Jolie, Kate Hudson, Zendaya, and Robin Wright.

Over the years, Barrett has also provided wardrobes for movie productions including Spider-Man 2, Spider-Man 3, I, Robot, and Ghost Rider: Spirit of Vengeance.

References

Models 
Marco Castelli

Baptiste Radufe

Kevin Mistry

External links
Company website
NYMag entry for Neil Barret
Style Magazine's  entry on Neil Barret collections 2005-2014
Sherwood's interview to Neil Barret  for the Independent

Living people
English fashion designers
High fashion brands
English businesspeople in fashion
Year of birth missing (living people)